The badminton competition at the 1994 Commonwealth Games took place in Victoria, British Columbia, Canada from 20 August until 28 August 1994. There were no bronze medal play off matches because both losing semi-finalists were awarded a bronze medal.

Medal summary

Medal table

Medalists

Singles results

Men's singles

Women's singles

Doubles results

Men's doubles

Women's doubles

Mixed doubles

Mixed team results

Semi-finals

Final

References

 
 

1994
1994 Commonwealth Games events
1994 in badminton
Badminton tournaments in Canada